Paul May (8 May 1909 – 25 February 1976) was a German film director and editor. He directed 40 films between 1935 and 1972.

Biography
He was the son of Peter Ostermayr, a film producer with Universum Film AG, and his wife Olga, née Wernhard. After secondary school in Feldkirch, he entered to film industry and trained in film laboratory work. He became a film editor in 1930 and assistant director in 1935. His first film as director was Edelweißkönig, in 1938.

After the Second World War, he adopted the pseudonym Paul May. His greatest successes were 08/15 (1954), The Forests Sing Forever (1959), Via Mala (1961) from the book by John Knittel, and Scotland Yard Hunts Dr. Mabuse (1963) with Peter van Eyck. He also directed for television. He directed more than forty films between 1935 and 1972.

Selected filmography

Editor

 Panic in Chicago (1931)
 Shooting Festival in Schilda (1931)
 The Spanish Fly (1931)
 The Champion Shot (1932)
 Secret of the Blue Room (1932)
 The Peak Scaler (1933)
 William Tell (1934)
  Holiday From Myself (1934)
 The Four Musketeers (1934)
Peter, Paul and Nanette (1935)
 Miracle of Flight (1935)
 Home Guardsman Bruggler (1936)
 The Hunter of Fall (1936)
 His Best Friend (1937)
 Triad (1938)
 Frau Sixta (1938)
 Storms in May (1938)

Screenwriter
  Night of the Twelve (1949)

Director
Film

1939: Der Edelweißkönig
1939: Waldrausch 
1940: Beates Flitterwoche / Sonderbare Flitterwochen
1940: Left of the Isar, Right of the Spree
1942: Violanta (also co-script)
1943: Die unheimliche Wandlung des Alex Roscher
1949: Duel with Death (also script); Prod. G. W. Pabst
1950: King for One Night (also producer)
1952: Two People
1953: Young Heart Full of Love
1954: 08/15
1954: The Phantom of the Big Tent
1955: Doctor Solm 
1955: 
1955: 
1956: Weil du arm bist, mußt du früher sterben
1957: Weißer Holunder 
1957: 
1957: The Fox of Paris 
1958: 
1959: The Forests Sing Forever
1959: Heimat, deine Lieder 
1960: Der Schleier fiel
1960: Soldatensender Calais 
1961: Via Mala
1961: Freddy and the Millionaire
1962: Waldrausch
1963: 
1963: Scotland Yard Hunts Dr. Mabuse
1967:  

Television
1964: Die Truhe — (based on a play by James Liggat and Alan Reeve-Jones)
1965:  (TV miniseries) — (remake of Francis Durbridge's The Desperate People, 1963)
1965: Glück in Frankreich — (based on a story by Ernst von Salomon)
1965: Acht Stunden Zeit — (based on a play by Charles Maître)
1966:  (TV miniseries) — (remake of Francis Durbridge's Melissa, 1964)
1967: In Sachen Erzberger gegen Helfferich — (screenplay by Axel Eggebrecht)
1967–1968: Sherlock Holmes (TV series) — (remake of Sherlock Holmes, 1965)
1968: Eine Gefangene bei Stalin und Hitler — (based on Under Two Dictators by Margarete Buber-Neumann)
1969–1972: Königlich Bayerisches Amtsgericht (TV series, 7 episodes)
1969: Nennen Sie mich Alex — (film about Oleg Penkovsky)
1970: Theatergarderobe (TV series)
1971: Die Schrott-Story
1971–1972: Fünf Tage hat die Woche (TV series)
1972: Nicht Lob – noch Furcht. Graf Galen, Bischof von Münster — (screenplay by Luise Rinser)
1972–1975:  (TV series, 32 episodes)

References

External links

1909 births
1976 deaths
Mass media people from Munich
German film directors
German film editors